Duppa  may refer to:

Brian Duppa (1588–1662), English bishop
Phillip Darrell Duppa (1832–1892), pioneer in the settlement of Arizona, USA
Richard Duppa (1770–1831), English writer and draughtsman
Thomas Duppa (fl. 1554), English member of parliament
Jack Duppa-Miller (1903–1994), Royal Navy officer who was awarded the George Cross
Vic Duppa-Whyte (1934–1986), British paper engineer and author